Acrocercops praesecta is a moth of the family Gracillariidae, known from Fiji. It was described by Edward Meyrick in 1922. The hostplants for the species include Ipomoea batatas and Merremia peltata.

References

praesecta
Moths of Oceania
Moths described in 1922